Donev is a Bulgarian surname. Notable people with the surname include:

Asparuh "Paro" Donev Nikodimov (born 1945), former Bulgarian football player and coach
Doncho Donev, retired Bulgarian professional footballer
Donyo Donev, Bulgarian animator, director, art director and cartoonist
Ivo Donev, Bulgarian professional chess and poker player
Gabriel Donev, Bulgarian tennis player

Bulgarian-language surnames